Saint-Fabrizio or Fabriciano martyr, is revered as a saint by the Catholic Church. He was the first bishop of Porto, in Portugal. He is remembered with Saint Philibert and liturgical memorial on 22 August. He died in the third century AD in Toledo, Spain.

Veneration
He is revered in the Archdiocese of Toledo, Spain, following the tradition upheld in the Mozarabic Missal and Breviary in the appendix to the same rite, Cardinal Francisco Jiménez from Cisneros in the years 1500 and 1506.

His feast is celebrated on the eighth of the Ascension, and his name was not among those collected from Usuardo during his trip to Spain in AD 858.

The Roman Martyrology edited by Cesare Baronius states that  ancient manuscripts and documents relating to him exist in the Church of Toledo. But currently sources documenting the life of this saint are unknown.

References

Saints from Hispania
3rd-century deaths
3rd-century Christian saints
3rd-century Christian martyrs
3rd-century bishops in Hispania
Bishops of Porto
History of Porto
Year of birth unknown